Kenelm Oswald Lancelot Burridge (October 31, 1922 – May 21, 2019) was a Maltese-born Canadian anthropologist.

Biography 
Kenelm Burridge was born in October 1922 in Malta. After a childhood in Lucknow, India, he attended school in Great Britain. Burridge enlisted in the Royal Navy in 1939, serving throughout World War II. Although his ship, was sunk off Naples, Italy in 1943 and he was captured, Burridge escaped, returned to naval service, and retired as a lieutenant three years later.

He entered Exeter College, Oxford University in 1946, receiving a B.A. in 1948 in social anthropology, followed by a B.Litt. in 1950 and an M.A. in 1952 in anthropology.  In 1954 he received his Ph.D. in anthropology from the Australian National University, Canberra, his dissertation was entitled Social Control in Tangu.

Burridge conducted fieldwork in Papua New Guinea, Malaya (where he was a research fellow at the University of Malaya), Australia, New Hebrides, and India. His main interests during his scholarly career were the ethnography of Oceania, and Malaya; religion; chiliasms; social and symbolic organization; anthropological history and theory; myth; museology; and missionaries and missiology. Many of his studies have looked specifically at millenarianism and cargo cults, and religious aspects of cultural change. As John Barker writes in the Association for Social Anthropology in Oceania's 1991 Newsletter, Burridge's "most ambitious book, Someone, No One, (1979), combines anthropology, history, philosophy and theology in a nuanced understanding of the dynamics of being an individual."

After teaching at Baghdad University and Oxford University, he served as a professor of anthropology at the University of British Columbia from 1968 until retiring and assuming emeritus status in 1987. Burridge also served as visiting lecturer or professor at the University of Western Australia, Princeton University, and International Christian University in Tokyo. In 1977, he was elected a fellow of the Royal Society of Canada. He died in May 2019 at the age of 96.

Books 
Mambu. A Melanesian Millennium. Methuen, 1960. (Reprinted as Mambu. A Melanesian Millennium. Princeton, Princeton Univ. Press, 1995. .)
Tangu Traditions. A Study In The Way of Life, Mythology and Developing Experience of A New Guinea People. Oxford, Clarendon Press, 1969, .
New Heaven, New Earth. A Study of Millenarian Activities. Oxford, Basil Blackwell, 1969, .
Encountering Aborigines. A Case Study: Anthropology and the Australian Aboriginal. Pergamon Press, 1973, .
Someone, No One: An Essay on Individuality. Princeton University Press, 1979, .
In The Way: A Study of Christian Missionary Endeavours. University of British Columbia Press, 1991, .

References

External links 
 John Barker's Tribute to Kenelm Burridge
 Kenelm O.L. Burridge fonds at UBC Library
 Kenelm Burridge's faculty page at UBC
 At Solitary Way blog, a long quotation from Burridge's New Heaven, New Earth
 Interview with Kenelm Burridge (September 25th, 2016), from the series "Les Possédés et leurs mondes", by the journal Anthropologie et Sociétés

1922 births
2019 deaths
Anthropologists of religion
Fellows of the Royal Society of Canada
Academic staff of the University of British Columbia
Maltese emigrants to Canada
Royal Navy officers of World War II
British World War II prisoners of war
World War II prisoners of war held by Italy
Escapees from Italian detention